Grand-Mère may refer to:

 the French word for grandmother
 Grand-Mère, Quebec, a former city now part of Shawinigan
 Grand-Mère railway station